Pinus densiflora, also called the Japanese red pine, the Japanese pine, or Korean red pine, is a species of pine tree native to East Asia. In China it is known as 赤松 (pinyin:chì sōng, literally "red pine").

Distribution and habitat
P. densiflora has a home range that includes Japan, the Korean Peninsula, northeastern China (Heilongjiang, Jilin, Liaoning, Shandong and northeastern Jiangsu) and the extreme southeast of Russia (in Siberia, southern Primorsky Krai).

Description
The short leaves are 5-6 cm. There are stomatal lines on both sides of the leaf, 2 vascular bundles, about 3-9 resin canals, and fine serrations on the edge of the leaf. Branchlets with more or less white powder. Male cones are light reddish yellow, clustered in the lower part of new branchs, female cones are light reddish purple, solitary or clustered in 2-3 clusters. The cones are dark brown yellow or light brown yellow when mature, they dehiscent at maturity, seed scales usually thin, seed winged. The bark is orange-red, cracked into irregular scale-like pieces. Heartwood reddish brown, sapwood light reddish yellow. The crown can reach 30 meters. 

"The distribution of P. densiflora in China has the following pattern of variation: the more northward it is distributed, the needles are relatively shorter, the white powder on the branchlets is sometimes less obvious or partly obvious, and the color of the cones is lighter. It is light brown yellow".

It is closely related to Scots pine, differing in the longer, slenderer leaves which are mid-green without the glaucous-blue tone of Scots pine. This pine has become a popular ornamental and has several cultivars, but in the winter it becomes yellowish. The plant prefers full sun on well-drained, slightly acidic soil.

Uses
Strong wind resistance, P. densiflora  is an excellent tree species for afforestation in stony mountains, barren soil and sandy land. The timber can be used for construction, electric poles, sleepers, ore pillars, furniture, and wood fiber industrial raw materials. The trunk is rich in resin, from which rosin and turpentine can be extracted. Essential oil can be extracted from the leaves. In northeast China, matsutake relies on P. densiflora for growth. "Jilin Tianfozhishan National Nature Reserve/Jilin Tianfozhishan National Nature Reserve" takes Matsutake, P. densiflora and ecosystem as the main protection objects. P. densiflora wood has natural anti-corrosion and anti-mildew properties, and natural preservatives and natural wood anti-mold agents can be extracted. P. densiflora has non-stinging needles and soft branches, making it easy to shape as a penjing.

Cultivation
It is widely cultivated in Japan both for timber production and as an ornamental tree, and plays an important part in the classic Japanese garden. Numerous cultivars have been selected, including the variegated semi-dwarf Oculus Draconis, the pendulous, often contorted Pendula and the multi-trunked 'Umbraculifera' (Japanese 多形松 tagyoushou, sometimes spelled as tanyosho).

In Korea, simply called sonamu (소나무, literally "pine tree"), it takes special status. Historically, Korean dynasties looked after timber and resin production banning laypeople from logging them. Korean aristocrats, or Yangban, loved it because they thought this evergreen tree represented virtues of Confucianism, "fidelity" and "fortitude". In this strongly Confucian society, it became the national symbol. For the Korean people, even today, it is considered to represent Korean spirit and mentioned in the South Korean national anthem, Aegukga. Since it was introduced to the West by Japanese scholars, it was named the "Japanese red pine" in English. In Korea, the Korea Forest Service has changed the English name to 'Korean red pine'.

References

Further reading

densiflora
Trees of China
Trees of Japan
Trees of Korea
Trees of Russia
Plants described in 1842